Mathias Eick (born 26 June 1979) is a Norwegian jazz musician, and the brother of the jazz musicians Johannes Eick and Trude Eick. He is mainly known from his releases on the jazz label ECM Records. His main instrument is the trumpet, but he also plays upright bass, vibraphone, piano and guitar. He has performed with several well-known music groups and musicians, e.g. Jaga Jazzist, Manu Katché, and the Trondheim Jazz Orchestra together with Chick Corea and Pat Metheny. Besides this he is also known for his collaboration with Norwegian singer-songwriter Thomas Dybdahl, and recordings with the Norwegian bands Turboneger, DumDum Boys, Motorpsycho, D'Sound and Bigbang.

Career 

After finishing high school, he started on the Music program at the Toneheim Folkehøyskole near by Hamar, followed by studies on the Jazz program at Trondheim Musikkonsevatorium.

Born in 1979 Eick has marvellous range of achievements to show for himself: in 2007 he won the International Jazz Talent, awarded to him by the International Jazz Festivals Organization situated in New York. He then won the Statoil Scholarship in 2009, undoubtedly the largest scholarship in Norway, as he was heading for the release of his second album on one of the worlds most influential jazz record labels, ECM.

In the meantime Eick keeps himself busy participating on several albums playing either trumpet, double bass, vibraphone, piano, guitar, or in his own words “anything needed.” Some of his collaborators have been, among a vast amount of others, Trondheim Jazz Orchestra and Chick Corea, Iro Haarla, Manu Katché and Jacob Young. Eick is also a member of the Norwegian genre-defying group Jaga Jazzist, a group with which he has performed for many years. In the summer of 2006 he toured with Jan Gunnar Hoff Group and Mike Stern and in October/November on European tour with Thomas Dybdahl.

Eicks band is currently a five-piece, featuring two drummers, bass, piano and Eick himself. The lineup changes invariably as all the participating musicians are amongst Norway's finest, but for the most part the band consists of Andreas Ulvo (piano), Torstein Lofthus and Gard Nilssen (drums), and Audun Erlien (bass). The music is composed by Eick and pays tribute to both the truly unique Scandinavian soundscape, as well as the lyricism and melancholy of the Canadian trumpeter Kenny Wheeler.

In 2013 Eick appeared at the North Sea Jazz Festival within his own Quintet including Andreas Ulvo (piano, Fender Rhodes, keyboards, electronics), Audun Erlien (bass), Andreas Bye & Kenneth Kapstad (drums).

Discography

Solo albums 
2008: The Door (ECM)
2011: Skala (ECM)
2015: Midwest (ECM)
2018: Ravensburg (ECM)
2021: When We Leave (ECM)

As a Sideman 

With Jaga Jazzist
2001: A Livingroom Hush (Ninja Tune)
2003: The Stix (Ninja Tune)
2005: What We Must (Ninja Tune)
2010: One-Armed Bandit (Ninja Tune)
2013: Live with Britten Sinfonia (Ninja Tune)

With Jacob Young
2004: Evening Falls (ECM)
2007: Sideways (ECM)

With Jan Gunnar Hoff
2008: Magma (Grappa Music)

With Iro Haarla
2004: Northbound (ECM) with Trygve Seim, Uffe Krokfors and Jon Christensen
2011: Vespers (ECM) with Trygve Seim, Ulf Krokfors and Jon Christensen

With Manu Katché
2007: Playground (ECM) with Trygve Seim, Marcin Wasilewski, Slawomir Kurkiewicz and David Torn

With Music for a While including Tora Augestad, Stian Carstensen, Martin Taxt and Pål Hausken
2007:: Weill Variations (Grappa Music)
2012: Graces That Refrain (Grappa Music)
2014: Canticles of Winter (Grappa Music)

With Lars Danielsson
2009: Tarantella (ACT Music)
2014: Liberetto II (ACT Music)

With Ola Kvernberg's Liarbird
2011: Liarbird (Jazzland Recordings), the commissioned work, live from Moldejazz 2010 including Bergmund Waal Skaslien (viola), Eirik Hegdal (saxophone), Håkon Kornstad (saxophone), Ingebrigt Håker Flaten and Ole Morten Vågan (bass), as well as Erik Nylander and Torstein Lofthus (drums)

With Elvira Nikolaisen
2013: I Concentrate On You (Grappa)

With Eple Trio
2014: Universal Cycle (Shipwreckords)

With Vincent Peirani
2013: SWR NewJazz Meeting 2013 with Émile Parisien (Jazzhaus)
2016: Living Being Extended with Émile Parisien, Leïla Martial, Yoann Serra, Tony Paeleman and Julien Herné (SWR JazzHaus)

With Unifony (Minco Eggersman and Theodoor Borger)
 2018: Unifony (Butler Records)

As a Session Musician 
 2001: Motorpsycho - Phanerothyme
 2002: Motorpsycho - It's a Love Cult
 2002: Arcturus - The Sham Mirrors
 2003: The Gathering - Souvenirs
 2003: Motorpsycho w/ Jaga Jazzist Horns - In the Fishtank 10
 2004: Lars Horntveth - Pooka
 2004: Janove Ottesen - Francis' Lonely Nights
 2005: Turbonegro - Party Animals
 2006: Kinny & Horne - Forgetting to Remember
 2007: Ulver - Shadows of the Sun
 2008: Jan Gunnar Hoff - Magma
 2009: Youn Sun Nah - Voyage
 2009: Inger Marie Gundersen - My Heart Would Have a Reason
 2009: Thomas Dybdahl - En Samling (compilation)
 2009: Silvertongue - Diamond Sky
 2010: Motorpsycho - Heavy Metal Fruit
 2010: Mighty Sam McClain w/ Mahsa Vahdat - Scent of Reunion: Love Duets Across Civilizations
 2012: Mighty Sam McClain w/ Mahsa Vahdat - A Deeper Tone of Longing: Love Duets Across Civilizations
 2012: Alexander Von Mehren - Aéropop

Awards 
Mathias Eick was awarded “The International Jazz Award for New Talent 2007”. He received a prize of $20,000 US on 13 January 2007 during the IAJE 34th Annual International Conference in New York City where he also performed. The annual prize was founded by IAJE in cooperation with the International Jazz Festivals Organization (IJFO). He was awarded the 2014 DNB price at Kongsberg Jazzfestival (300,000 NOK).

References

External links 

IAJE 34th Annual International Conference  (PDF Brochure).
 International Jazz Festivals Organizations (IJFO)
International Association for Jazz Education (IAJE).

Festival sites 
Molde-jazz
Montreal Jazz festival
Montreux Jazz Festival 
Monterey Jazz Festival

Jaga Jazzist members
1979 births
ECM Records artists
Living people
Musicians from Furnes, Norway
Norwegian jazz composers
Norwegian jazz trumpeters
Male trumpeters
Norwegian multi-instrumentalists
20th-century Norwegian trumpeters
21st-century Norwegian trumpeters
20th-century Norwegian multi-instrumentalists
21st-century Norwegian multi-instrumentalists
Norwegian University of Science and Technology alumni
Male jazz composers
Trondheim Jazz Orchestra members
Jacob Young Group members
Music for a While (band) members
Motif (band) members